Louis Rey (21 July 1885 – 23 October 1972) was a French architect. His work was part of the architecture event in the art competition at the 1928 Summer Olympics.

References

1885 births
1972 deaths
20th-century French architects
Olympic competitors in art competitions
Place of birth missing